Paul Henry Fuoss is an American physicist who specializes in the study of X-ray scattering and grazing incident scattering.

Early life and education 
Fuoss was born to parents Floyd and Sylvia Fuoss and raised in South Dakota, where he attended Spears Rural School, followed by Draper High School in Draper and T. F. Riggs High School in Pierre. Fuoss graduated from the South Dakota School of Mines and Technology and completed a doctorate at Stanford University.

Career 
Fuoss worked at Bell Labs, AT&T Laboratories, and the Argonne National Laboratory, then returned to Stanford as technician at SLAC National Accelerator Laboratory in 2017. While at AT&T Laboratories, Fuoss was elected a fellow of the American Physical Society in 1999, "[f]or pioneering contributions to the science of x-ray scattering, including anomalous scattering for amorphous materials, grazing incident scattering to study monolayers on surfaces and in-situ scattering during chemical vapor deposition."

References

Scientists at Bell Labs
Argonne National Laboratory people
South Dakota School of Mines and Technology alumni
Year of birth missing (living people)
Living people
20th-century American physicists
21st-century American physicists
Scientists from South Dakota
Stanford University alumni
Fellows of the American Physical Society
People from Jones County, South Dakota